Mădălin Marius Ciucă (born 4 November 1982) is a Romanian former professional footballer who played as a centre back for clubs such as FC Caracal, FC U Craiova 1948 or Politehnica Iași, among others. Ciucă played in 357 matches at the level of Liga I, Liga II and Liga III.

References

External links
 
 

1982 births
Living people
Sportspeople from Craiova
Romanian footballers
Association football defenders
Liga I players
Liga II players
FC U Craiova 1948 players
ACF Gloria Bistrița players
CS Gaz Metan Mediaș players
CS Sportul Snagov players
FC Politehnica Iași (2010) players
FC UTA Arad players
FC Argeș Pitești players